Eckhart Public Library and Park is a historic library building and public park located at Auburn, DeKalb County, Indiana.  The library was built in 1911, and is a two-story, glazed brick building with Bungalow / American Craftsman design elements.  It has a gable roof, round arched windows, and sits on a raised basement faced with Bedford limestone.  The library and park were donated by Charles Eckhart.  Located in the park is a contributing fountain added in 1918.

It was added to the National Register of Historic Places in 1981.

The Eckhart Public Library remains in operation today as one of four libraries serving Dekalb County.

References

External links
 Eckhart Public Library

Libraries on the National Register of Historic Places in Indiana
Library buildings completed in 1911
Buildings and structures in DeKalb County, Indiana
Education in DeKalb County, Indiana
National Register of Historic Places in DeKalb County, Indiana
1911 establishments in Indiana
Public libraries in Indiana